Junction High School is a 2A public high school located in Junction, Texas (USA). It is part of the Junction Independent School District located in central Kimble County. In 2011, the school was rated "Academically Acceptable" by the Texas Education Agency.

Athletics
The Junction Eagles compete in the following sports:
American Football
Baseball
Basketball
Cheerleading
Cross Country
Football
Golf
Softball
Tennis
Track and Field
Volleyball

State Titles
Boys Track - 
1948(B), 2002(2A)
Spirit and Cheer Team
2016 (2A), 2017 (2A), 2018 (2A)

Notable alumni

Andrew Murr (Class of 1995), former county judge of Kimble County; incoming Republican member of the Texas House of Representatives from District 53

References

External links
Junction ISD

Public high schools in Texas